American settlement in the Philippines began during the Spanish colonial period. The period of American colonialization of the Philippines was 48 years. It began with the cession of the Philippines to the U.S. by Spain in 1898 and lasted until the U.S. recognition of Philippine independence in 1946. After independence in 1946, many Americans chose to remain in the Philippines while maintaining relations with relatives in the US. Most of them were professionals, but missionaries continued to settle the country. In 2015, the U.S. State Department estimated in 2016 that more than 220,000 U.S. citizens lived in the Philippines and more than 650,000 visited per year, with a significant mixed population of Amerasians and descendants from the colonial era as well.

The United States invaded the Philippines, which was then governed by Spain as the Spanish East Indies, during the Spanish–American War. During that war, Philippine revolutionaries declared independence. Wanting to maintain a stronghold over the island nation as a stepping stone to Japan and continental Asia, the United States maintained authority of the archipelago and the Philippine–American War ensued. America then held the Philippines until granting full independence on July 4, 1946.

History of immigration

Spanish colonialization

American colonialization
American colonial rule in the Philippines saw an increase in immigration to the Philippines. Retiring soldiers and other military-men were among the first Americans to become long-term Philippine residents and settlers; these included African-American Soldiers and former volunteer Soldiers primarily from the Western states. The Education Act of 1901 authorized the colonial government to recruit American teachers to help establish the new educational system, and 80 former soldiers became teachers. They were soon joined by 48 teachers recruited in America who arrived in June 1901 on the ship Sheridan, named after Philip Sheridan and by 523 others who arrived on August 1, 1901, on the Thomas. Collectively, these teachers became known as the Thomasites. Besides English, the Thomasites taught agriculture, reading, grammar, geography, mathematics, general courses, trade courses, housekeeping and household arts (sewing, crocheting and cooking), manual trading, mechanical drawing, freehand drawing and athletics (baseball, track and field, tennis, indoor baseball and basketball). Many of these people settled in the Philippines and had Filipino spouses. 

By 1913, there were more than 1,400 mestizos with American parentage, the product of the nearly 8,000 Americans living in the Philippines. 15% of the children of Americans who settled in the Philippines were orphans. Prior to World War II, Americans were not prevalent in the Philippines, most living in enclaves, particularly around Fort Santiago; one term for those who settled in the Philippines was Manila Americans. By 1939, 8,709 Americans were in the Philippines, primarily in Manila, and of whom only 4,022 were working age and employed. The Japanese invasion of the Philippines brought about an abrupt end to the distinctions of race, due to the external threat caused by the invasion.

Post independence

The 1940s was a period of large-scale American immigration to the Philippines. However, this abruptly ended after the Philippines gained independence from the United States in 1946 and Many Americans chose to permanently settle in the Philippines. The Americans, until the mid-1990s, had a heavy presence in the cities of Angeles and Olongapo, northwest of Metro Manila, due to the presence of large US military bases there. During the American colonial period (1898–1946), a recorded number of more than 800,000 Americans were born in the Philippines. Large concentrations of Filipinos with American ancestry aside from Metro Manila are located in the areas of the former US bases such as the Subic Bay area in Zambales and Clark Field in Angeles City.

Lasting impacts 
The colonialization period of the Philippines formally ended in 1946, yet scholars continue to debate about the lasting impacts of American settlement in the Philippines. Critical internationalists of the early Cold War saw the similarities between US-Philippines relations and European imperialism. Notions of neocolonialism have been attached in describing the United States' relations with the Philippines. Some historians of American foreign relations have argued that Philippine formal independence in 1946 was incomplete and unequal, and that there exists a 'dependent' alliance between the two countries. It has also been argued that historians who have drawn conclusions mainly from hindsight should pay closer attention contemporary views.

Amerasians

As the Philippines lies in Southeast Asia, the offspring of a Filipino national and an American service member or contractor is termed an Amerasian. These individuals were not covered under the American Homecoming Act.

In 1939, there were an estimated 50,000 mixed race American mestizos, The 1939 census was undertaken in conformity with Section 1 of Commonwealth Act 170. The Philippine population figure was 16,000,303. In 2012, the number of American mestizos is estimated to be 52,000. Most speak English, Tagalog and/or other Philippine languages. The majority are to be found in Angeles City, which has the largest proportion of Amerasians in the Philippines. Amerasians born in the Philippines have also intermarried with other Amerasian and Filipino natives creating a large number of Amerasian people with less than 50% Amerasian heritages.

A 2012 paper by an Angeles, Pampanga, Philippines Amerasian college research study unit suggests that the number of military origin, biracial Filipino Amerasians probably lie between 200,000 and 250,000, and possibly substantially more. The paper maintained that the number of Filipino Amerasians, the progeny of U.S. servicemen, private corporate contractor and government employees stationed over the years in the Philippines, is so significant that mixed-heritage Anglo, African and Latino Amerasians qualify as a genuine human diaspora. It focused on stigmatization, discrimination, psychosocial risks, and mental disorders among a sample of African and Anglo Amerasians residing in Angeles, site of the Clark Air Force Base. The paper asserts that the Angeles-Manila-Olongapo Triangle (AMO) contains the highest concentration of biracial Anglo, African and Latino Amerasians in the world.

Today, the Philippines has a large population of Americans and people with American roots, including a significant Amerasian population; there are estimates of 52,000 to 250,000 Amerasians in the Philippines in 1992. These Americans have been joined by a number of Filipino Americans with U.S. citizenship who had immigrated to the United States, then returned to their country of birth. In addition, there is a population of Filipino Americans, who were born in the United States, who are immigrating to the Philippines, known as "baliktad". In 2016, the total number of US citizens living in the Philippines was estimated officially as more than 220,000, with an unofficial source having estimated 600,000 in 2013.

Education
American international schools in the Philippines include:
 International School Manila (formerly the "American School")
 St. Paul American School - Clark

Notable people

Media

See also

 Afro-Asian
 Eurasians
 Foreign Account Tax Compliance Act
 Philippines–United States relations
 Philippine nationality law
Demographics of the Philippines

References

American diaspora in Asia
 
American emigration